David A. Horton (born 14 March 1962) is the Group CEO of QBE Insurance (QBE), an Australian Insurance company.  Prior, he was the chief executive of Beazley Group (BG) a European insurance company. He was appointed as Beazley CEO on 1 September 2008. Horton was born in Manchester and brought up in Bedfordshire where he attended Bedford School before reading natural sciences at Cambridge. He was appointed to the Man Group board in August 2013 as a non executive director.

Career
He was previously finance director of BG and has been on the board since June 2003. Prior to that, he was the UK chief financial officer at ING and was the deputy global chief financial officer and global head of finance for the equity markets division of ING Barings, having held various financial positions with the company since January 1997. He qualified as a chartered accountant with Coopers and Lybrand in 1987.

In March 2021, Andrew Horton was announced as the next Group CEO of QBE Insurance.

Andrew Horton recently appeared on BBC Radio 4's show 'The Bottom Line', hosted by Evan Davis.

Despite a year of natural disasters including Hurricane Sandy, Horton told the Insurance Times he expected a strong performance from Beazley in 2012. Horton has spoken  to the Financial Times on this topic also, suggesting an 'advantage' to non-tragic catastrophes for the insurance industry.

References 

British chief executives
Living people
1962 births
People educated at Bedford School